Beom-soo, also spelled Bum-soo or Beom-su, is a Korean given name, that is a masculine name. The meaning differs based on the hanja used to write the name. There are 13 hanja with the reading "beom" and 67 hanja with the reading "soo" on the South Korean government's official list of hanja which may be registered for use in given names.

People with this name include:

Kim Bum-soo (businessman) (born 1966), chairman of Daum Kakao, a South Korean internet company
Kim Bum-soo (footballer born 1968), South Korean football goalkeeper and coach
Lee Beom-soo (born 1970), South Korean actor
Kim Bum-soo (born 1979), South Korean singer

See also
List of Korean given names

References